is a town located in Ibaraki Prefecture, Japan. The percentage of the population aged over 65 was 34.0%. The Japan Atomic Energy Agency operates a research center in Ōarai with a number of nuclear research reactors, including the Jōyō and High-temperature engineering test reactor facilities.

Geography
Located on the coast of central Ibaraki Prefecture, Ōarai is located in the flatlands near the Pacific Ocean, and borders Lake Hinuma, the 30th largest body of freshwater in Japan. The Naka River flows through the town.  Ōarai and Sun Beach bathing beaches were first to introduce barrier-free bathing beaches for the disabled in Japan.

Surrounding municipalities
Ibaraki Prefecture
 Mito
 Hitachinaka
 Hokota
 Ibaraki

Climate
Ōarai has a Humid continental climate (Köppen Cfa) characterized by warm summers and cold winters with light snowfall.

Demographics
Per Japanese census data, the population of Ōarai has declined steadily over the past 70 years.

History
The villages of Isohama and Ōnuki within Higashiibaraki District and the village of Natsumi within Kashima District were created with the establishment of the modern municipalities system on April 1, 1889. Ōnuki was elevated to town status on January 26, 1894.  Ōnuki and Isohama merged on November 3, 1954 to create the town of Ōarai. A portion of Natsumi was annexed by Ōarai on July 23, 1955.

In 1928, Nisshō Inoue, the founder of the far-right militant organization , relocated to Ōarai, where he established , which served as a youth training center advocating a militarist revolution in Japan, eventually resulting in the 1932 League of Blood Incident.

Since 1998 the chief of a factory association in Oarai has invited Japanese descendants and migrants from North Sulawesi, Indonesia, to work for seafood industries. A majority of the Indonesians inhabitants was later arrested for being undocumented.

Government
Ōarai has a mayor-council form of government with a directly elected mayor and a unicameral town council of 12 members. Ōarai, together with neighboring Hokota and Ibaraki, contributes two members to the Ibaraki Prefectural Assembly. In terms of national politics, the town is part of Ibaraki 2nd district of the lower house of the Diet of Japan.

Economy
The nuclear industry and government largess form the basis of the local economy. Main agricultural products include rice, sweet potatoes and Japanese radish. The commercial fishing industry is important, and main fishery products include whitebait, sardines, flounder and clams. Marine food processing includes salted and dried horse mackerel, smelt and sardines and boiled octopus.

Education
 Ōarai has two public elementary schools and two public middle schools operated by the town government, and one public high school operated by the Ibaraki Prefectural Board of Education.

Transportation

Railway
 – Kashima Rinkai Railway Ōarai Kashima Line 
 Ōarai Station

Highway

Seaport
 Port of Ōarai (A MOL Ferry operates two ferries to Tomakomai, Hokkaidō daily)

Local attractions
Ōarai attracts 3 million visitors a year.  Tourist attractions include bathing beaches, yacht and cruiser marina, marine sports, camping site, fishing, aquarium, and a famous golf course. It is known for its monkfish.
 Ōarai Beach
 Aqua World (formerly Ōarai Aquarium)
 Ōarai Marine Tower
 Ōarai Sea Museum
 Ōarai Museum of Art
 Ōarai Museum of Bakumatsu-Meiji History
 "Kurumazuka-kofun" and "Kagamizuka-kofun"
 Ōarai Isozaki Jinja

Noted people from Ōarai 
Kei Igawa. professional baseball player
Hiromoto Okubo. professional baseball player
Akua Shōma. professional sumo wrestler

In popular culture
The city has become an anime pilgrimage location due to being the setting for the popular franchise Girls und Panzer. The main characters of the animated series study in a huge ship originally based in Ōarai. Real locations in the city are depicted faithfully, prompting fans to visit the town and giving a boost to local commerce.

References

External links
 
Official Website 

Towns in Ibaraki Prefecture
Port settlements in Japan
Populated coastal places in Japan
Ōarai, Ibaraki